Beavercreek High School is the public high school in Beavercreek, Ohio. A member of the Beavercreek City School District, the high school has an enrollment of more than 2,300 students. The high school campus consists of Ferguson Hall, a free-standing building that houses the ninth grade, and the high school which accommodates the remaining grades 10–12. The principal is Dale Wren for the 2020-2021 school year and the school's mascot is the Battling Beaver.

Beavercreek High School offers eleven Advanced Placement (AP) classes to students, in addition to many Honors and Scholarship courses which award additional points to the compiled grade point average (GPA) of each student.

History
The first high school in Beavercreek Township was built in 1888 at the southwest corner of Factory Road and Dayton-Xenia Road, the present site of Ritters Frozen Custard. Recognized as the second high school in the state of Ohio, the initial enrollment was 20 pupils. Freshmen and sophomores occupied the south room, while juniors and seniors attended class in the north room. Two additional rooms were added in 1914 to accommodate increasing enrollment.

In 1932, the township's entire school system was consolidated into a newly constructed school at the corner of Hanes Road and Dayton-Xenia Road as a result of the increasing demands from both enrollment and the State Board of Education. The school later became known as Main Elementary School after a new high school opened in 1954 at its present location on Dayton-Xenia Rd. The original high school was used as an apartment residence for several years, but later changed hands among several businesses in the area including Marshall Brothers and the Mead paper company. Its last known usage was as a restaurant known as LaMachey's; however, the building was torn down after the restaurant caught fire.

On January 3, 1964, a U.S. Air Force B-57 bomber narrowly missed crashing into the school building, after the pilot was forced to eject while en route to Wright-Patterson Air Force Base in Dayton.  The largest section of the wreckage landed within a few feet of the school; Principal Roger Sweet told reporters afterward, "We were just real, real fortunate."

Beavercreek's school system was redistricted several times since the 1970s, changing the high school back and forth between a three-year system and four-year system. The latest change occurred in 2013 with the opening of Trebein Elementary and Jacob Coy Middle School. Ferguson Middle School became Ferguson Hall for ninth graders as part of a campus formation with Beavercreek High School. Following the relocation of ninth graders, the high school became a three-year system housing grades 10–12.

Student statistics
According to the Ohio Department of Education, in the 2005–2006 school year, there are 23 students per full-time employed teacher. 88% of the students are White American, 6% are Asian American or Pacific Islander American, 3% are multiracial, 2% are African American, and 2% are Hispanic. The total per pupil expenditures is $7,055, compared to the state average of $9,052  The attendance rate is 93%, and the graduation rate is 96 percent.

Athletics
The school's girls basketball team averaged over 18 wins per season under coach Ed Zink's 36-year tenure. On February 10, 2011, Zink became the first girls high school basketball coach in state history to reach 658 wins.

Ohio High School Athletic Association State Championships

 Baseball – 1941, 1952, 1953 
 Boys bowling – 2015, 2023
 Boys soccer – 2017
 Boys Swimming - 2022
 Girls basketball – 1995, 2001, 2003 
 Girls cross country – 1996, 2018, 2019 
 Girls bowling – 2007, 2014 
 Girls soccer - 2018

Beavercreek Band and Choir Programs
The Beavercreek Band has qualified for the OMEA State Marching Band Finals since 1987, earning the highest possible ranking of "I – Superior" every year since 1989. They have the longest superior streak in Ohio history. The Beavercreek Band and Color Guard  consists of jazz ensembles and concert bands as well as an extracurricular pep band, marching band, color guard, winter guard, and winter percussion ensemble.

Weekend of Jazz
The Beavercreek High School Instrumental Music Department hosts the Weekend of Jazz each year during the first weekend in March. Past performers have included Maynard Ferguson, Victor Wooten, Stanley Clarke, Big Phat Band, Ellis Marsalis Jr. and Jon Secada. Additionally, high school ensembles from throughout the area are invited to perform and receive professional critique.

Choir
The Beavercreek High school Choir program is currently under the direction of Mrs. Rachel Phillips. Choir is an all-inclusive class offered in everyday schedule that uses auditions to place students. There are four choirs offered during the school day: Treble Choir, Concert Choir, Beavercreek Chorale, and Women's Choir.

Cabaret
Cabaret is an event held by all the choirs during the late fall. The choir students offer a dinner to those who attend as well as a show of all the choirs, including Beavercreek Middle School "Entourage" Show Choir and the Beavercreek High school "Friends" Show Choir.

Clubs and extra-curricular activities
Beavercreek High School's Latin Club functions as a local chapter of both the Ohio Junior Classical League (OJCL) and National Junior Classical League (NJCL).

The high school's Speech and Debate team earned five of the thirteen award positions, the most of any school in competition, in the regional national qualifiers for Student Congress in 2010.

The school has a Science Olympiad Team.

BHS has a competitive show choir, "Friends". The group competes in Indiana and Ohio, and won three grand championships in the 2019 season. The program also hosts its own competition, the Midwest Show Choir Classic.

Accomplishments
 The school's Academic Challenge team won WHIO-TV's High-Q quiz bowl competition during the 1998–1999, 2000–2001 and 2001–2002 seasons.  During those seasons, they set the current records for all-time high score (830), most championships (3) and most consecutive wins (16).  The team won the state championship in 1990, 1994, 2000 and 2001, representing the state of Ohio in the Panasonic Academic Challenge in Orlando, Florida. It also represented the state of Ohio in 1992.
 The school's Science Bowl team competed in the 2006 National Science Bowl, and qualified again in 2007. It also qualified for the National Science Bowl in 2000 and 2004.
 In 2007, the school's Thespian Troupe and Drama Club performed Songs for a New World at the International Thespian Conference in Lincoln, Nebraska.  This was the first time for the school, and they were one of 11 schools chosen to perform on the main stage.
 The school's National History Bowl team won the 2017 Junior Varsity National Championships, as well as the 2019 Varsity National Championships.

Track renovation
Because of a deteriorating track, 1.3 million dollars was spent by Miami Valley Hospital to renovate it. The new track includes an all-season surface. The grass football field was also replaced with artificial turf.

Another benefit is that the athletes will be able to use athletic-related services from the hospital. The new facility was named Frank Zink Field at Miami Valley Hospital Stadium, which is a slight change from the previous name, "Frank Zink Field."

Notable alumni

 Alison Bales (class of 2003) – WNBA player
 Marjorie Corcoran (class of 1968) – particle physicist
 Bobby Durnbaugh – Major League Baseball player
 Mike Hauschild – Major League Baseball pitcher
 Jarrod Martin – former Ohio state representative
 Justin Masterson – Major League Baseball pitcher
 Joe Moore (class of 1965) – news anchor, actor and playwright
 Jill Paice (class of 1998) – actress and singer
 Aftab Pureval (class of 2001) – Mayor of Cincinnati
 Mikaela Ruef – Women's National Basketball League player
 Janet C. Wolfenbarger (class of 1976) – retired four-star general in the U.S. Air Force

References

External links
 

High schools in Greene County, Ohio
Public high schools in Ohio
Beavercreek, Ohio
1888 establishments in Ohio